The Ontario Global Edge Program is an international competitive internship program which allows postsecondary students aged 19 to 29 to gain international work experience. It was created and funded by the Government of Ontario.

The program sends students to a variety of locations around the world, including Hong Kong and Germany.

Overview
As part of the March 2008 Ontario Budget, the Global Edge program was announced with funding of $1.7 million over four years, to facilitate international work and learning opportunities for enterprising post-secondary students.

Approved schools
Currently, nine schools are approved to offer the Global Edge program.

Carleton University
Confederation College
Fanshawe College
George Brown College
Seneca College
University of Ontario Institute of Technology
University of Ottawa
University of Waterloo
University of Western Ontario

External links
Ontario Global Edge Main Page
March 2008 Ontario Budget

References

Entrepreneurship organizations